The Parque das Aves (English: Bird Park) is a sanctuary and shelter for birds situated in Foz do Iguaçu, Paraná State, Brazil, and it is near to Iguaçu Falls. Its exhibits comprise mainly birds as well as other animals and butterflies.

The park was opened in 1994 and it is set within  of forest.

Gallery

References

External links

Parque das Aves - Foz do Iguaçu

Zoos in Brazil
1994 establishments in Brazil
Aviaries
Buildings and structures in Paraná (state)
Tourist attractions in Paraná (state)
Zoos established in 1994